The Consolidated Farm and Rural Development Act of 1961 (P.L. 87-128) authorized a major expansion of USDA lending activities, which at the time were administered by Farmers Home Administration (FmHA), but now through the Farm Service Agency.  The legislation was originally enacted as the Consolidated Farmers Home Administration Act of 1961.

The S. 1643 legislation was signed into law by the thirty-fifth President of the United States John F. Kennedy on August 8, 1961.

In 1972, this title was changed to the Consolidated Farm and Rural Development Act, and is often referred to as the Con Act.  The Con Act, as amended, currently serves as the authorizing statute for USDA’s agricultural and rural development lending programs. Titles in the Act include current authority for the following three major FSA farm loan programs: farm ownership, farm operating and emergency disaster loans.  Title III of the Con Act is the Rural Development Act of 1972 (P.L.92-419) authorizing rural development loans and grants.

Amendments to 1961 Act
Chronological amendments and revisions to the Consolidated Farm and Rural Development Act of 1961.

See also
 Consolidated Farm and Rural Development Act of 1972

References

External links
 

United States federal agriculture legislation
1961 in American law
1961 in the United States
87th United States Congress